Party Monster may refer to

 Re-release title of Disco Bloodbath, a book by James St. James about the murder of Andre "Angel" Melendez
 Party Monster: The Shockumentary (1998), a documentary on the murder case and on the book
 Party Monster (2003 film), a feature film based on the book
 "Party Monster: Scratching the Surface", a season 4 episode of Unbreakable Kimmy Schmidt
 "Party Monster" (song), a 2016 song by The Weeknd

See also 
 Monster Party